Rusten John Abrahams is a South African field hockey player. He competed in the 2020 Summer Olympics.

References

External links

1997 births
Living people
Field hockey players at the 2020 Summer Olympics
South African male field hockey players
Olympic field hockey players of South Africa
Male field hockey midfielders
Field hockey players from Johannesburg
21st-century South African people